This is a list of academic journals, monographic series, and other serials published by E. Schweizerbart.

A

B

C

D

E

F

G

H

I

J

K

L

M

N

P

Q

R

S

T

U

V

W

Z

External links
Serials list at schweizerbart.de

E. Schweizerbart